Lisa Lorentzen (also published as Lisa Jacobsen) is a Norwegian mathematician known for her work on continued fractions. She is a professor emerita in the Department of Mathematical Sciences at the Norwegian University of Science and Technology (NTNU).

Books
With , Lorentzen is the author of the book Continued Fractions with Applications (Studies in Computational Mathematics 3, North-Holland, 1992; 2nd ed., Atlantis Studies in Mathematics for Engineering and Science, Springer, 2008).

She is also the author of two textbooks in Norwegian: Kalkulus for ingeniører [Calculus for engineers] and  [What is mathematics?], and co-author with Arne Hole and Tom Louis Lindstrøm of Kalkulus med én og flere variable [Calculus with single and multiple variables].

Recognition
Lorentzen is a member of the Royal Norwegian Society of Sciences and Letters.
She was the 1986 winner of the academic prize of the Royal Norwegian Society of Sciences and Letters.

References

Year of birth missing (living people)
Living people
Norwegian mathematicians
Norwegian women mathematicians
Academic staff of the Norwegian University of Science and Technology
Royal Norwegian Society of Sciences and Letters